Undercovers is an album of cover songs released by melodic rock band Trixter.

Track listing
"Pump It Up" – 3:41 (Elvis Costello and the Attractions)
"50 Ways to Leave Your Lover" – 4:42 (Paul Simon)
"Terrible Lie" – 4:24 (Nine Inch Nails)
"Take the Long Way Home" – 5:17 (Supertramp)
"Dirty Deeds Done Dirt Cheap" – 3:56 (AC/DC)
"Revolution" – 3:45 (the Beatles)
"50 Ways to Leave Your Lover" (Unplugged) – 4:30 (Paul Simon)
"(You Gotta) Fight for Your Right (To Party)" (Live) – 4:05 (Beastie Boys)

Credits

Trixter
Peter Loran – guitars, lead vocals on "50 Ways" & "Take The Long Way Home", lead guitar on "Fight For Your Right"
P. J. Farley – bass, percussion, lead vocals on "Terrible Lie" & "Dirty Deeds", drums on "Fight For Your Right"
Steve Brown – lead guitars, dobro, lap steel, blues harp, lead vocals on "Pump It Up" & "Revolution", bass on "Fight For Your Right"
Mark "Gus" Scott – drums, verbal madness on "Fight For Your Right"

References
[ Allmusic]

Trixter albums
1994 albums